Cortinarius gentilis is a fungus of the subgenus Telamonia, normally found in North America and Europe.

Reportedly, no evidence has been found that the Finnish C. gentilis is toxic; thereby it differs from specimens from other countries.

Description
The cap is bright tan and umbonate. The flesh is tan, with an odour of raw potatoes. The stem resembles a root and has yellow veil remnants near the bottom. The gills are distant, similarly coloured to the cap but sometimes reddish with age.

Toxicity
The toxicity of the Cortinarius orellanus group of mushrooms became apparent in the 1950s. C. gentilis was considered toxic in Finnish mycological publications. It was reported to belong to subgenus Leprocybe and to contain the toxin orellanine, but these details have since been disputed.

The original opinion was primarily based on the study by Mottonen et al. (1975) and on a case study by Hulmi et al. (1975), papers which were cited in later publications. When the specimens on which the first-named study was based were rechecked, it turned out that the original material used for the rat feeding test by Mottonen with his co-workers as not adequately documented. In order to examine the possible toxicity of Finnish C. gentilis mushrooms, the present authors studied 28 samples of this species. An unspecific cell culture toxicity test and a feeding test on mice revealed no toxicity in C. gentilis.

See also
List of deadly fungi

References

gentilis
Fungi of North America
Fungi of Europe
Taxa described in 1796
Poisonous fungi
Taxa named by Elias Magnus Fries